Vincent Alexandre Jockin (born 31 May 1976) is a French composer and musician.

Biography 
Beginning with 1995, after obtaining the bachelor's degree of Science (B.S.), Jockin continued his musical studies at the University of Toulouse, then at Conservatory when he studied Harmony and Writing (counterpoint) with Paul Badens.

His first album of compositions was released in 2012: Works, Volume 1, recorded and produced at F.A.M.E.’S. Project Studio (MRT Center, Skopje, Republic of Macedonia), and performed by the Macedonian Radio Symphonic Orchestra conducted by Oleg Kondratenko. Excerpts of this album have been broadcast on France Musique and other European radio channels. His work has had premieres in Spain, Bulgaria, Croatia, Romania, Australia, USA and France.

He has collaborated with Thibaut Garcia, a French guitarist, to compose several works for solo guitar.

Discography 
 Works, Volume 1 (2012)

Compositions (selection)

Orchestral works 
 Polegnala E Todora, Op. 18, No. 1 (2005)
 Nos âmes mortes (Our Losts Spirits), Op. 22, No. 1 (2007)
 La marche des petits soldats de bois (The March Of The Small Wooden Soldiers), Op. 22, No. 2 (2008)

Chamber music 
 Sonata, Opus 21, for piano (2007)
 Un souffle sur nos âmes (A Breath On Our Spirits), Opus 25, for clarinet and string quartet (2009)
 Farfalle, Op. 26, No. 1, for flute and bass clarinet (2010)
 Prelude, Op. 26, No. 2, for solo violin (2011)
 Moment Musical, Op. 26, No. 4, for solo guitar (2013)
 Quintet, Op. 27, No. 1, for trumpet and string quartet (2012)
 Brass Quintet, Op. 27, No. 2, for 2 trumpets, horn, trombone and tuba (2013)

References

External links 
  
  
  Works of Vincent A. Jockin on SACEM

1976 births
French classical composers
French male classical composers
21st-century classical composers
Living people
21st-century French composers
21st-century French male musicians